A State of Trance 2008 is the fifth compilation album in the A State of Trance compilation series mixed and compiled by Dutch DJ and record producer Armin van Buuren. The 2 disc album was released on 29 September 2008 by Armada Music. It peaked at No. 5 on the Billboard Top Dance/Electronic Albums in October 2008.

Track listing

Disc one: On the Beach
 Armin van Buuren featuring Jaren – "Unforgivable" (First State Remix) – [6:22]
 DJ Tatana – "Spring Breeze" (Martin Roth SummerStyle Remix) – [4:53]
 Mike Foyle – "Bittersweet Nightshade" – [3:33]
 M6 – "Amazon Dawn" – [4:09]
 Andy Moor – "Fake Awake" (The Blizzard Remix) – [6:09]
 Blake Jarrell – "Punta Del Este" – [3:25]
 Benya featuring Penny Nixon – "Serendipity" – [4:46]
 Ohmna – "Satori Waterfalls" – [6:06]
 Signalrunners featuring Julie Thompson – "These Shoulders" (Club Mix) – [5:36]
 Myon and Shane 54 featuring Carrie Skipper – "Vampire" (Club Mix) – [6:46]
 Julian Vincent featuring Cathy Burton – "Certainty" (Mark Otten Dub) – [5:18]
 Tenishia featuring Tiff Lacey – "Burning from the Inside" (Tenishia's Burning Dub) – [5:59]
 Mr. Sam featuring Claud9 – "Cygnes" – [5:55]
 Lange – "Out of the Sky" (Kyau & Albert Remix) – [5:52]

Disc two: In the Club
 Arnej featuring Josie – "Strangers We've Become" (Intro Tech Dub) – [5:14]
 Sunlounger featuring Zara – "Lost" (Club Mix) – [7:13]
 Offer Nissim – "For Your Love" (Sied van Riel Remix) – [3:51]
 Ilya Soloviev and Paul Miller – "Lover Summer" (Orjan Nilsen Remix) – [7:40]
 Markus Schulz – "The New World" – [3:48]
 Robert Nickson and Daniel Kandi – "Rewire" – [4:56]
 Giuseppe Ottaviani featuring Stephen Pickup – "No More Alone" – [3:58]
 The Thrillseekers featuring Fisher – "The Last Time" (Simon Bostock Remix) – [3:55]
 Stoneface & Terminal – "Blueprint" (Club Mix) – [5:55]
 DJ Shah featuring Adrina Thorpe – "Back to You" (Aly & Fila Remix) – [6:31]
 Andy Blueman – "Time to Rest" (Live Guitar by Eller van Buuren) – [6:09]
 Thomas Bronzwaer – "Certitude" – [3:43]
 8 Wonders – "The Return" – [6:02]
 Jochen Miller – "Lost Connection" – [1:51]
 Armin van Buuren featuring Sharon Den Adel – "In and Out of Love" (Richard Durand Remix) – [4:02]

Charts

References

External links 
Tracklist at Armada Music

Armin van Buuren compilation albums
Electronic compilation albums
2008 compilation albums